Jan Buryán (born 17 February 1977) is a Czech football player.

Buryán played over 200 matches in the Gambrinus liga, playing mostly for Viktoria Žižkov. He most recently played for Polish side Piast Gliwice.

External links

1977 births
Living people
People from Benátky nad Jizerou
Czech footballers
Czech First League players
FK Viktoria Žižkov players
1. FK Příbram players
FK Dukla Prague players
MFK Karviná players
Ekstraklasa players
Piast Gliwice players
Czech expatriate footballers
Czech expatriate sportspeople in Poland
Expatriate footballers in Poland
Association football defenders
Sportspeople from the Central Bohemian Region
FC Petržalka players